Chmerkovskiy is a surname. Notable people with the surname include: 

Maksim Chmerkovskiy (born 1980), Ukrainian-American dancer, choreographer, and teacher
Valentin Chmerkovskiy (born 1986), Ukrainian-American  dancer